The National Voluntary Organizations Active in Disaster (National VOAD, or NVOAD) is a coalition of the major national voluntary organizations in the United States that have made disaster-related work a priority. National VOAD member agencies provide skilled direct services along the continuum from disaster prevention and preparation to response, recovery, and mitigation. NVOAD is the only nationwide organization of VOAD members in the United States.

History
National VOAD was founded in 1970 in response to the challenges many disaster organizations experienced following Hurricane Camille, which hit the Gulf Coast in August 1969.

Prior to the founding of National VOAD, numerous organizations served disaster victims independently of one another. These included both government and the private, nonprofit sector. As a result, help came to the disaster victim haphazardly as various organizations assisted in specific ways. Unnecessary duplication of effort often occurred, while at the same time, other needs were not met. People who wanted to volunteer to help their neighbors affected by disaster were often frustrated by the variety of organizations in some areas of service and the total lack of opportunities to serve other needs. Further, there was only limited availability of training for potential volunteers. Information for victims on services during disasters was woefully inadequate. Likewise, communication among voluntary disaster agencies was very limited and coordination of services was negligible. In fact, mechanisms for this were non-existent.

The seven founding organizations met on July 15, 1970 in the American Red Cross headquarters to establish a unified response to national disasters, committing to fostering the 4Cs—cooperation, communication, coordination, and collaboration —in order to better serve people impacted by disasters. In attendance were the Seventh-day Adventist Church, Southern Baptist Convention, Mennonite Disaster Service, St. Vincent de Paul Society, Christian Reformed World Relief Committee, the National Disaster Relief Office of the Roman Catholic Church, and the American Red Cross. Annual meetings were held from 1971 onward, and National VOAD was established in 1975.

National VOAD is a leader and voice for the nonprofit organizations and volunteers that work in all phases of disaster — preparedness, response, relief, recovery, and mitigation. National VOAD is the primary point of contact for voluntary organization in the National Response Coordination Center (at Federal Emergency Management Agency (FEMA) headquarters) and is a signatory to the National Response Plan.

Since the initial seven founding organizations convened in 1970, National VOAD's membership has grown to 110 Members total, including 55 National Member organizations and 55 State/Territory Members.

In 2010, FEMA and National VOAD signed a Memorandum of Understanding (MOU) with each other to broaden the communication and coordination between FEMA and National VOAD’s Members.

National members
 Adventist Community Services
 All Hands Volunteers
 American Baptist Men
 American Radio Relay League
 American Red Cross
 Brethren Disaster Ministries
 Catholic Charities, USA
 Christian Disaster Response International
 Christian Reformed World Relief Committee
 Church World Service
 Church of Scientology Disaster Response (also known as Volunteer Ministers)
 City Team Ministries
 Convoy of Hope
 Episcopal Relief and Development
 Feeding America (Formerly America's Second Harvest)
 Feed the Children
 Habitat for Humanity International
 Headwaters Relief Organization
 Hope Coalition America
 The Humane Society of the United States
 International Aid
 International Critical Incident Stress Foundation
 International Organization for Victim Assistance
 International Relief and Development
 International Relief Friendship Foundation
 Jewish Federations of North America
 Latter-Day Saint Charities
 Lutheran Disaster Response
 Mennonite Disaster Service
 Mercy Medical Airlift/Angel Flight America
 National Association of Jewish Chaplains
 National Organization for Victim Assistance
 Nazarene Disaster Response
 Noah's Wish - Animal Disaster Response
 Operation Blessing
 Presbyterian Disaster Assistance
 REACT International
 The Salvation Army
 Samaritan’s Purse
 Save the Children
 Society of St. Vincent de Paul
 Southern Baptist Convention –North American Mission Board
 Taiwan Buddhist Tzu Chi Foundation USA
 Team Rubicon
 United Church of Christ –Wider Church Ministries
 United Methodist Committee on Relief (UMCOR)
 United Way Worldwide
 Volunteers of America
 World Vision

References 

NVOAD.org About Us

External links
 
 Ready.gov

Disaster management
Emergency services in the United States